The South Atlantic League Hall of Fame is an American baseball hall of fame which honors players, managers, executives, and other associates of the Class A South Atlantic League of Minor League Baseball and its predecessor, the Western Carolinas League, for their accomplishments or contributions to the league in playing, administrative, or other roles. The Hall of Fame inducted its first class in 1994. As of 2018, 113 individuals have been inducted into the South Atlantic League Hall of Fame.

Table key

Inductees

References

External links
Official website

Hall
Minor league baseball museums and halls of fame
Minor league baseball trophies and awards
Awards established in 1994
1994 establishments in the United States